Eric Davis may refer to:

 Eric Davis (American football) (born 1968), former American football player
 Eric Davis (baseball) (born 1962), former Major League Baseball center fielder
 Eric Davis (clown), American actor, comedian, director and clown
 Eric Davis (footballer, born 1932) (1932–2007), English footballer
 Eric Davis (Panamanian footballer) (born 1991), Panamanian footballer
 Eric Davis (rugby union) (1917–2001), rugby union player who represented Australia
 Eric Davis (candidate), Liberal Party candidate in Ontario
 Erik Davis (baseball) (born 1986), baseball pitcher
 Eric Davis, musician of the band Blue Cheer

See also
 Eric Davies (1909–1976), South African cricketer
 Eric Davies (administrator), the Welsh chairman of Rhyl F.C. and Mayor of Rhyl